Bohumil Andrejko (born 10 February 1953 in Stropkov, Czechoslovakia) is a Slovak football coach and former striker. He played for VSS Košice (1972–81), Lokomotíva Košice (1984–86) and he made 201 appearances and scored 55 goals at the Czechoslovak First League.

Andrejko played overall 16 games and scored 2 goals for the Czechoslovakia national under-16, under-18 and under-23 team but never played for the first team.

He was an assistant coach of the Slovakia U-21 team at the 2000 UEFA European Under-21 Football Championship and the 2000 Summer Olympics alongside Dušan Radolský. He was also a head coach of 1. FC Košice and the Slovakia U-19 team.

References

1953 births
Living people
People from Stropkov
Sportspeople from the Prešov Region
Slovak footballers
Slovakia youth international footballers
Czechoslovak footballers
FC VSS Košice players
Slovak football managers
FC VSS Košice managers
Association football forwards